Frank Sharp may refer to:

 Frank Sharp (land developer) (1906–1993), American land developer and businessman involved in the Sharpstown scandal
 Frank Sharp (footballer, born 1947), Scottish football winger with clubs including Barnsley
 Frank Sharp (footballer, born 1899) (1899–1963), English football forward with Birmingham and Chesterfield
 Frank Chapman Sharp (1866–1943), American philosopher